Baphia cymosa is a plant species native to Gabon in central Africa. The plant grows there in tropical rainforest.

Baphia cymosa is a small tree up to 4 m tall. Leaves are simple, broadly elliptical, tapering at the tip, glabrous on the upper side but with a few light hairs on the underside. Flowers are white, borne in small groups.

References

cymosa
Flora of Gabon